McNaughton is an unincorporated community located in Oneida County, Wisconsin, United States. McNaughton is located on Wisconsin Highway 47 northwest of Rhinelander, in the town of Newbold.

History
A post office called McNaughton operated from 1890 until May 21, 2011. The community was named in honor of a local sawmill operator.

References

Unincorporated communities in Oneida County, Wisconsin
Unincorporated communities in Wisconsin